KSIM (1400 AM) is a radio station licensed to serve Sikeston, Missouri, United States. The station is owned by Max Media and licensed to MRR License LLC. It airs a News/Talk format. KSIM shares significant programming with sister station KZIM.

History
KSIM went on the air in 1948 and was owned by the Sikeston Community Broadcasting Company. It broadcast with 250 watts until beginning broadcast at 1,000 watts during the day in 1962. KSIM was able to get on the air because of KFVS—the future KZIM—moving to 960 kHz. Prime Time Broadcasting Corporation bought KSIM in 1977. It was sold to KSIM, Inc., in 1993, and to the Zimmer Radio Group in 1996.

In December 2003, Mississippi River Radio, acting as Max Media LLC (John Trinder, president/COO), reached an agreement to purchase WCIL, WCIL-FM, WUEZ, WXLT, WOOZ-FM, WJPF, KGIR, KZIM, KEZS-FM, KCGQ-FM, KMAL, KLSC, KWOC, KJEZ, KKLR-FM, KGKS, and KSIM from the Zimmer Radio Group (James L. Zimmer, owner). The reported value of this 17-station transaction was $43 million.

References

External links
KSIM official website

SIM
News and talk radio stations in the United States
Scott County, Missouri
Radio stations established in 1982
1982 establishments in Missouri
Max Media radio stations